John Rouse may refer to:
John Rouse (librarian)
John Rouse (MP)
John Rous, or Rouse, privateer and then an officer of the Royal Navy

See also
John Rous (disambiguation)